Mack as a surname may have multiple sources. One source is Gaelic origin, meaning son. Mack is often used as a prefix in many Irish, and Scottish surnames, including MacCarthy and MacDermot. MacDonald, and MacGregor.

Notable people
 Alexander Mack (1679-1739), German/American minister
 Alexander Mack (Medal of Honor) (c. 1834–1907), Civil War Medal of Honor recipient
 Alex Mack (born 1985), American football player
 Alizé Mack (born 1997), American football player
 Allison Mack (born 1982), American actor best known for her role in Smallville
 Andrew Mack (1780–1854), mayor of Detroit in 1834
 Andrew Mack (actor) (1863–1931), American actor and songwriter
 Austin Mack (born 1997), American football player
 Betty Mack (1901–1980), American film actress
 Bill Mack (disambiguation), various people
 Brooklyn Mack, American ballet dancer
 Burton L. Mack, American theologian
 Cecil Mack (1883–1944), American composer, lyricist and music publisher
 Chris Mack (disambiguation), various people
 Christy Mack (born 1991), American former pornographic actress
 An American family that started in baseball and has moved into politics:
 Connie Mack (1862–1956), baseball player, executive, and team owner
 Earle Mack (1890–1967), Connie's son; baseball player
 Connie Mack III (born 1940), grandson of Connie and nephew of Earle; politician
 Connie Mack IV (born 1967), son of Connie III; politician
 Mary Bono Mack (born 1961), wife of Connie IV; politician and widow of Sonny Bono
 Craig Mack (1970–2018), American rapper
 Darren Mack (born 1961), American criminal and fugitive
 Daryl Mack (1958–2006), American convicted murderer
 David Alan Mack, writer best known for his freelance Star Trek novels
 David Anthony Mack (born 1961), central figure in the LAPD Rampart police corruption scandal
 David S. Mack, American businessman
 Daylon Mack (born 1997), American football player
 Denny Mack (1851–1888), baseball player
 Earle I. Mack (born 1938), businessman and former US Ambassador
 Ebenezer Mack (1791–1849), New York politician
 Edward Mack (1826–1882), also known as E. Mack, was a German-American composer
 Elbert Mack (born 1986), American football cornerback
 Eugen Mack (1907–1978), Swiss gymnast and Olympic Champion
 H. Bert Mack (1912–1992), American real estate developer
 Hans-Joachim Mack (1928–2008), German general
 Helen Mack (1913–1986), American actress
 Ida May Mack, American classic female blues singer and songwriter
 Isaiah Mack (born 1996), American football player
 Jerome D. Mack (a.k.a. Jerry Mack) (1920–1998) was an American banker, real estate investor, political fundraiser and philanthropist in Las Vegas, Nevada.
 Jimmy Mack (broadcaster) (1934–2004), Scottish radio and television presenter
 Joe Mack (disambiguation), various people
 John E. Mack (1929–2004), American psychiatrist, writer, and professor at Harvard Medical School
 John J. Mack (born 1944), CEO of Morgan Stanley
 John M. Mack (1864–1924), also known as Jack Mack, founder of Mack Trucks
 Karen Mack, American television producer for CBS and co-author of three novels from Los Angeles, California.
 Karl Mack von Leiberich (1752–1828), Austrian general, famous for his defeat at Ulm in Napoleon's campaign of 1805
 Katie Mack (astrophysicist), Australian astrophysicist 
 Katie Mack (cricketer), Australian cricketer 
 Kevin Mack (disambiguation), multiple people
 Khalil Mack (born 1991), American football player
 Kirby Mack (born 1983), American professional wrestler, went by the ring name Krazy K but best known for the tag team, Team MackTion, that he formed with his brother T.J.
 Kyle Mack (born 1997), American freestyle snowboarder
 Ledarius Mack (born 1996), American football player
 Lee Mack (born 1968), stage name for English stand-up comedian Lee Gordon McKillop.
 Lonnie Mack (1941–2016), stage name of American blues-rock guitarist and singer, Lonnie McIntosh
 Max Mack (1884–1973), German silent screenwriter and film director
 Marlon Mack (born 1996), American football player
 Mary Mack, American stand-up comedian
 Mirren Mack, Scottish actress
 Myrna Mack (1949–1990), Guatemalan anthropologist, murdered because of her criticism towards the government's abuses during Guatemalan Civil War.
 Nate Mack (1891–1965), Polish-born American banker; co-founder of the Bank of Las Vegas.
 Norman Edward Mack (1855–1932), editor and publisher of the Buffalo Daily Times
 Oliver Mack (born 1957), retired American professional basketball player
 Parker Mack (born 1996), American actor
 Peter F. Mack, Jr. (1916–1986), former U.S. politician
 Ray Mack (1916–1969), American professional baseball player
 Raymond Mack (1927–2011), American sociologist
 Red Mack (1937–2021), American football wide receiver and halfback
 Reinhold Mack, record producer known for working with Electric Light Orchestra, Queen and other rock bands
 Rico Mack (born 1971), American football player
 Robert Mack (1959–2020), Austrian ice hockey player
 Rodney Mack, ring name of professional wrestler Rodney Begnaud
 Sir Ronald Mack, Australian politician
 Ronnie Mack (1940–1963), American songwriter
 Russell Mack (1892 – 1972) American vaudeville performer, stage actor, film director, and producer 
 Sam Mack (born 1970), retired American professional basketball player
 Shane Mack (baseball) (born 1963), former left and center fielder
 Sherman Q. Mack (born 1972), Louisiana politician
 Shorty Mack (born 1981), international rapper and actor
 Steve Mack (born 1979),  Tara Mack (born 1983), Minnesota politician and a member of the Minnesota House of Representatives
 Ted Mack (radio-TV host) (1904–1976), host of Ted Mack and the Original Amateur Hour on radio and television
 Timothy Mack (born 1972), American pole vaulter and Olympic champion
 Tom Mack (born 1943), former left guard
 Warner Mack (1935-2022), American musician
 Wayne Mack, sportscaster
 Willard Mack (1873–1934), Canadian-born actor, director, and playwright
 William Mack (disambiguation), various people

Fictional characters
 Andi, Rebecca “Bex”, and Celia Mack from Disney Channel series Andi Mack; later Bowie when he marries Bex
 The title character for the 1990s show The Secret World of Alex Mack
 Mark Mack, character in the HBO series Oz

Gaelic-language surnames
Surnames of Irish origin
Surnames of Scottish origin